= Styria (province) =

Styria may refer to:

- Styria, Slovenia
- Styria, Austria
